Taj Khatun (also Romanized as Tāj Khātūn, Taj-i-Khātūn, and Tāj Khvātūn) is a village in Rahjerd-e Sharqi Rural District, Salafchegan District, Qom County, Qom Province, Iran. At the 2006 census, its population was 268, in 81 families.

References 

Populated places in Qom Province